Group Captain James Brian "Willie" Tait,  (9 December 1916 – 31 August 2007) was an officer in the Royal Air Force during and after the Second World War. He conducted 101 bombing missions during the war, including the one that finally sank the German battleship Tirpitz in 1944.  He succeeded Leonard Cheshire as commander of the famous 617 Squadron and with six gallantry decorations to his name, remains one of the most distinguished airmen in the history of the nations of the British Commonwealth.

Early career
Tait was born in Manchester and educated at Wellingborough School.  After visiting a Schneider Trophy event in 1928, he decided to join the RAF. He graduated from the RAF College Cranwell and was commissioned as a pilot officer in the RAF on 1 August 1936 and joined No. 51 Squadron RAF, flying Whitley bombers.  He was promoted to flying officer on 1 February 1938.

Second World War
Tait was active on bombing operations with 51 Squadron in 1940, including several long-distance raids on Berlin and the first British air raid on Italy, crossing the Alps to bomb Turin, and was awarded the Distinguished Flying Cross (DFC). He was promoted to flight lieutenant on 1 February 1940. By the end of the year, he was commanding 51 Squadron. On 10 February 1941, he led the aircraft involved in Operation Colossus flying from Malta to drop paratroops in southern Italy. For this mission, he was awarded the DSO. He was given a temporary promotion to squadron leader on 1 March 1941, which was later made substantive with the same seniority.

After Colossus, Tait joined 35 Squadron, the first squadron to be equipped with Handley Page Halifaxes.  He was awarded the first bar to his DSO for his exploits in leading a daylight raid on Kiel on 30 June 1941. He was mentioned in despatches in September 1941. Tait was rested from operations and posted to a training unit, but managed nevertheless to fly on the three "Thousand Bomber Raids" in early 1942.

In mid-1942, Tait was appointed to command No. 78 Squadron RAF and was mentioned in despatches during his period in command. He was made a temporary wing commander on 1 June 1942. In March 1944, he became base operations commander at RAF Waddington where he continued to fly missions with RAAF Lancaster crews despite holding a non-flying job.  He was given a substantive promotion to wing commander on 1 March 1944.

He returned to operational duties in May 1944, becoming Master Bomber of 5 Group.  His service in this role resulted in his being awarded a second bar to his DSO.

He succeeded Leonard Cheshire as commander of No. 617 Squadron RAF in July 1944. 617 Squadron, the famous "Dambusters" squadron, specialised in low-level target marking and precision attacks.  Under his command, the squadron bombed a series of V-1 storage sites and V-2 launching sites using Barnes Wallis's "Tallboy" 12,000 lb earthquake bomb.  Tait was awarded a bar to his DFC for pressing home a low-level attack in a daylight raid on the Kembs Barrage in Alsace against fierce defensive fire despite having a damaged aircraft.

On 15 September 1944, Tait led a force of 37 Avro Lancaster bombers of 617 Squadron and 9 Squadron on Operation Paravane.  Flying from an airfield at Yagodnik, near Arkhangelsk on the Kola Peninsula in northern Russia, they attacked the German battleship Tirpitz, in the Kaa Fjord.  Despite smoke obscuring the target, the Tirpitz was so severely damaged the German High Command decided the ship could not be restored to seaworthiness. Tirpitz was therefore moved to Tromsø so its armament could be used as defensive artillery against an anticipated Allied invasion. The Germans were able to keep the ship's lack of seaworthiness a secret and so its destruction remained a high priority. Tait led his force in a second attack on 28 October named Operation Obviate, this time from RAF Lossiemouth in Scotland (the ship's move having brought her within range). This raid was unsuccessful because of the heavy cloud obscuring the target shortly before the bombers arrived. On 12 November, Tait led his force against the Tirpitz for a third and final raid, Operation Catechism.  The Luftwaffe failed to intercept the British bombers, and three direct hits by "Tallboy" bombs left the ship capsized west of Tromsø, in the bay of Håkøybotn.

In mid-December 1944, Tait, having completed 101 missions, was grounded and assigned to train Canadian bomber crews. Like his predecessor at No. 617 Squadron, he was recommended for the Victoria Cross for his "sustained gallantry" over almost five years of operations. However, unlike Cheshire, he was awarded the third bar to his DSO. The citation for this award, published in a supplement to the London Gazette in January 1945, reads:

Post-war career
Tait remained in the RAF after the war, initially reverting to the rank of squadron leader. He was re-promoted to wing commander in 1947 (back-dated to October 1946). He served in South East Asia, India, the Middle East, and Singapore. He commanded RAF Coningsby, was promoted to group captain in 1953, appointed Aide-de-camp to the Queen in 1959, and retired from the RAF in 1964.

He retrained as a computer programmer, and joined ICL as a technical representative, working in Eastern Europe.  After a period with a haulage company, he became an investment adviser with Scottish Widows.  He finally retired in 1981.

He married Betty Plummer in 1945. They had met during the war when she was an officer in the Women's Auxiliary Air Force. She died in 1990. Tait died on 31 August 2007; he was survived by his son and two daughters.

Footnotes

References
 
 

|-

1916 births
2007 deaths
Royal Air Force officers
Royal Air Force personnel of World War II
British World War II pilots
British World War II bomber pilots
Graduates of the Royal Air Force College Cranwell
Companions of the Distinguished Service Order
Recipients of the Distinguished Flying Cross (United Kingdom)
People from Manchester
Military personnel from Manchester
People educated at Wellingborough School